Organised Chaos (normally abbreviated as OC), was a monthly LAN Party held in Cape Town, South Africa at the Sunningdale Sports Complex as well as other venues in both Bloemfontein and Port Elizabeth. The LAN has a current capacity of 540 after moving away from the Bellville Velodrome in April 2012. The largest LAN Party held by Organised Chaos was in December 2010 at the Bellville Velodrome with a total of 1263 attendees. Its main organizers are Dietmar Rheeder-Kleist, Lance Aylward and Kyra Rheeder-Kleist. It is currently the largest monthly gaming event and LAN party in Africa

Venues
The venues used by Organised Chaos to host LAN parties.

Current Venues

Cape Town
 Sunningdale Sports Complex
 Belville Velodrome

Bloemfontein
 Bloem Skou

Port Elizabeth
 Heinz Betz Hall - NMMU North Campus

Stellenbosch
 Academia

Past Venues

Cape Town

 Bellville Velodrome
 Mica Willowbridge
 Warehouse 17 - Victoria & Alfred Waterfront
 Fish Hoek Senior Sports Hall
 Milerton High School
 Thunder City
 Storm Modelling Agency
 Theo Marais Sports Hall
 Table View High School

Johannesburg
 Gallagher Convention Centre

Organised Gaming Association
The Organised Gaming Association arranged a number of tournaments including the Frontosa Call of Duty 4 series and the Cafe Viva DotA series. The establishment of OGA was met with controversy after it was announced that members would have to sign MSSA (Mind Sports South Africa) membership forms.
 The Frontosa Call of Duty 4 series has the highest prize money of all LAN events in South Africa, with a total of R30,000 (US$3,800) prize money.

The Organised Gaming Association has gone dormant and is no longer as a means of hosting tournaments pending a restructuring and massive development of a software framework required to run OGA.

The current tournament structure is formed by its crew members for each event with both social and competitive tournaments taking place. Prize money for the tournaments includes the pool of players buying into the tournaments and the internal contribution from Organised Chaos revenue.

Crew Members
The current Organised Chaos crew members who assist with the setup of the venues for each event, writing articles, web and application development, bookings, server administration, hosting tournaments, photography and technical assistance.

Owners/Organisers
 Dietmar Rheeder-Kleist (Owner)
 Lance Aylward (Owner/Development Team)
 Kyra Rheeder-Kleist (Booking Manager)

References

External links
 Organised Chaos website
 Organised Chaos Statistics website
 Organised Chaos Tournament/LANner portal
 Organised Chaos Sponsor Marketing Website (Under construction)

LAN parties
Cape Town culture